The Roman Catholic Diocese of Paranaguá is a diocese located in the city of Paranaguá in the Ecclesiastical province of Curitiba in Brazil.

History
 July 21, 1962: Established as Diocese of Paranaguá from the Metropolitan Archdiocese of Curitiba

Leadership
 Bishops of Paranaguá (Roman rite), listed in reverse chronological order
 Bishop Edmar Paron (2015.11.25 - Present)
 Bishop João Alves dos Santos, O.F.M. Cap. (2006.08.02 – 2015.04.09)
 Bishop Alfredo Ernest Novak, C.Ss.R. (1989.03.15 – 2006.08.02)
 Bishop Bernardo José Nolker, C.Ss.R. (1963.01.07 – 1989.03.15)

References
 GCatholic.org
 Catholic Hierarchy

Roman Catholic dioceses in Brazil
Christian organizations established in 1962
Paranagua, Roman Catholic Diocese of
Roman Catholic dioceses and prelatures established in the 20th century
Paranaguá